Martin Peter New (born 11 May 1959) is an English former professional footballer who played in the Football League for Barnsley and Mansfield Town.

References

1959 births
Living people
English footballers
Association football goalkeepers
English Football League players
Arsenal F.C. players
Mansfield Town F.C. players
Barnsley F.C. players
Wigan Athletic F.C. players
Burton Albion F.C. players
Nuneaton Borough F.C. players
Worksop Town F.C. players
King's Lynn F.C. players